Zinovy Moiseevich Vysokovsky (28 November 1932 – 3 August 2009) was a Soviet and Russian theater and movie actor and variety performer.  In 1978 he was awarded the People's Artist of the RSFSR. He was born in Taganrog, USSR.

Biography
In 1952 Zinovy Vysokovsky graduated with honors from the Chekhov Gymnasium. He went to Moscow with the intention to enter the Shchukin Drama School. He failed to be accepted and instead got an education in automation and space telemechanics at the Taganrog State University of Radioengineering. At the same time he kept trying to enter the Shchukin School and finally succeeded in 1957.

In 1961 Vysokovsky joined the troupe of the  Moscow Miniature Theatre.

Vysokovsky earned popularity as an actor both on stage and screen.  In the regular television program   Small Restaurant ‘13 Chairs’ he played the part of Pan Zyuzya from 1967. Vysokovsky also worked as a comedian in a number of solo programs.

Death
He died on the 77th year of life on the night of Monday, August 3, 2009 in Moscow.

Filmography
 1964 – The Alive and the Dead as Mikhail Weinstein
 1965 –  Švejk in World War II as Švejk
 1965 –  The Friends Through the Years as Grisha
 1968 –  Once More About Love as Pyotr Borisovich Halperin
 1969 –  Small Restaurant ‘13 Chairs’''' as Pan Zyuzya
 1974 –  The Marriage of Figaro  as Bartolo
 1975 – Small Comedies of the Big House as Tengiz
 1982 –  Through the Looking Glass as Tweedledum (voice)
 2006 –  The Soviet Park'' as steward at a funeral

References

External links

Soviet male actors
Russian male stage actors
People's Artists of Russia
Actors from Taganrog
1932 births
2009 deaths
Soviet Jews
Burials at Vagankovo Cemetery
Jewish Russian actors
Recipient of the Meritorious Activist of Culture badge